Diana Ildarovna Mironova (Moscow) is a Russian billiards player, the nine-time World champion in Russian pyramid.

Career
Diana became a billiards player at the age of six, although her father sent Diana to a billiards group two years before. The main coach of Diana Mironova is Sergey Baurov. Mironova won her first World title in 2010.

References

Links
 
 A profile at the Moscow Unite of Billiards

1996 births
Russian pool players
Female pool players
Sportspeople from Moscow
Living people